Adstone is a village and civil parish in West Northamptonshire, England. The population at the 2001 census was 65. It remained than 100 at the 2011 census and was included in the civil parish of Tiffield. It was known as Atenestone in the Domesday Book.

History
The villages name means 'Aettin's farm/settlement'.

Adstone was a chapelry within the parish of Canons Ashby until 1866, when it was promoted to a parish. The parish church, dedicated to All Saints, is of Norman origin, ca. 13th century. It was heavily restored in both 1843, when the chancel was added and again in 1896. Since 2006 the parish has formed part of the Lambfold benefice along with the parishes of Blakesley, Maidford, Litchborough and Farthingstone.  The Manor House is late 17th century, the Old Vicarage dates to 1870 by Edmund Francis Law, the school to 1846 and the Methodist Chapel is 1849 in Georgian style.

The Imperial Gazetteer of England and Wales in the 1870s described Adstone as follows:

The censuses showed that the population declined from 184 in 1871 to 80 in 1961 and 65 in 2001.

References

External links 
 

Villages in Northamptonshire
West Northamptonshire District
Civil parishes in Northamptonshire